William Street may refer to:

Streets 
 William Street, Brisbane in Queensland, Australia
 William Street (Carson City) in Carson City, Nevada, USA
 William Street, Limerick in Limerick, Ireland
 William Street (Manhattan), New York City, USA
 William Street, Melbourne in Victoria, Australia
 William Street, Perth in Western Australia
 William Street, Sydney, Australia
 William Street Historic District, in Massachusetts

People 
 William J. Street (1784–1847), Connecticut politician, father of William C. Street
 William C. Street (1816–1893), Connecticut politician, son of William J. Street
 William Douglas Street Jr., American con artist and impersonator

See also
King William Street (disambiguation)
William (disambiguation)
Williams Street, an animation studio
Williams Street Records, a record company
 William Streets (1772–?), English cricketer

Street, William